The Handball Federation of Slovenia (RZS) is the national authority responsible for the administration of handball in Slovenia and the Slovenia men's national handball team and the Slovenia women's national handball team. It are a member of the European Handball Federation (EHF) and the International Handball Federation (IHF). 

It organizes the following competitions:
Slovenian First League of Handball
Slovenian Handball Cup
Slovenian Handball Supercup
Slovenian First League (women's handball)

References

External links
 

Handball in Slovenia
Handball
Slovenia
Sports organizations established in 1949